Katarína Hasprová (born 10 September 1972 in Bratislava) is a singer from Slovakia, best-known outside her home country for singing "Modlitba" at the Eurovision Song Contest 1998.

Hasprová was born in Bratislava into a musical family. Her mother is a well-known Slovak actress and singer, her father a leading director of theatre and television. A graduate in music from the Janáček Music Academy, Katarína devotes all her time to singing and dancing and has performed in a number of classic musicals, including West Side Story and Hair.

See also 
 The 100 Greatest Slovak Albums of All Time

References 
 

1972 births
Living people
Musicians from Bratislava
20th-century Slovak women singers
Eurovision Song Contest entrants for Slovakia
Eurovision Song Contest entrants of 1998
Slovak film actresses
Slovak stage actresses
21st-century Slovak women singers